Oscar Pérez (4 November 1922 – 15 March 2002) was an Argentine basketball player who competed in the 1948 Summer Olympics when they finished 15th.

References

Argentine men's basketball players
Olympic basketball players of Argentina
Basketball players at the 1948 Summer Olympics
1922 births
2002 deaths